David António Lagarto Varela (born 16 November 1993) is a Portuguese canoeist. He competed in the men's K-4 500 metres event at the 2020 Summer Olympics.

References

External links
 

1993 births
Living people
People from Vila Franca de Xira
Portuguese male canoeists
Olympic canoeists of Portugal
Canoeists at the 2020 Summer Olympics
Sportspeople from Lisbon District